Eric Sanicola (born May 6, 1981) is an American music producer and songwriter credited on numerous Gold and Platinum albums, including various Billboard magazine charting singles.

Career 

Since the start of his career in 2003, he has written and/or produced songs (most notably) for Big Time Rush, Cascada, Jennifer Lopez,     Bishop Briggs, Cher Lloyd, One Direction, Paulina Rubio, Yanni, and David Bisbal among others. He began his career as a staff producer for Ric Wake and later, RedOne. In addition to contemporary pop music production, he has also done production work on the Disney film Enchanted and TV advertisements for Sunsilk, Stride Rite, and others.

Beginnings 

Sanicola's first opportunity came in 2000. At 18 years old, he wrote lyrics for Jennifer Lopez. Although they were not used on her album, he was able to capture the attention of producer Ric Wake, who gave Sanicola a publishing and production deal for the next six years, from whom Sanicola says he learned a great deal.

Discography 
2003 
 Thalia "Baby I'm In Love" Thalia (Virgin Records/ EMI Latin) — Arrangement

2005 
 Coco Lee "All Around The World" (Charlie's Angels 2 Soundtrack Asia) — writer/producer
 Coco Lee "No Doubt" — writer
 Michael Bolton "Still the love of my life" — writer

2006

 Paulina Rubio "N.O." — writer/producer
 Paulina Rubio "Miénteme Una Vez Más" — Producer
 David Bisbal "Calentando Voy" — writer/producer
 Anthony Callea "Hurt So Bad" — writer/producer

 2007

 Corbin Bleu "Marchin" Another Side (Hollywood Records) — Additional Production 

2008 
 Marié Digby "Say It Again" — writer
 Vlad Topalov "Perfect Criminal" (Russia) — writer/producer

2009

 Yanni "The Keeper" — writer
 Yanni "I'm So" — writer
 Yanni "Orchid" — writer

2010

 Big Time Rush "Halfway There" BTR (Columbia/Epic) — 
 Big Time Rush "City Is Ours" BTR (Columbia/Epic) — writer/producer
 J Brazil "Girl I'm Tryin" (Ultra Records) — writer/producer
 Sweetbox "Echo" Diamond Veil (Warner Music Japan, Sony Music Entertainment Korea Inc., Parasongs International Corporation) — writer
 Sirens "Don't Let Go" — writer

2011 
 Big Time Rush "Elevate", Elevate, (Columbia/Epic) — writer/producer 
 Cher Lloyd "Over The Moon", Sticks and Stones (Syco Music/Epic) — writer/producer
 One Direction "Another World", Up All Night (certain countries only), (Syco/Columbia) — writer
 Fairies "Hero" (Japan) — writer
 Alex Sparrow "Get You" Eurovision Song Contest 2011 — writer

2012

 U.V.U.K "Blink" (Robbins Entertainment)
 Jennifer Lopez "I'm Glad" (Ric Wake Unplugged Mix)  (Epic Records) Producer/Featured Artist

2013 
 Panama Wedding "All of the People" (Glassnote Records)— Writer/Producer
 Porcelain Black "How Do You Love Someone" (Capital/2101) — Writer/Producer
 Big Time Rush "Run Wild" 24/7, (Columbia/Epic) — Writer/Producer
 Big Time Rush "Love Me Again" 24/7, (Columbia/Epic) — Writer/Producer
 Dizzee Rascal "Love This Town" (featuring Teddy Sky) The Fifth, (Universal Music Group) — Writer/Producer
 Midnight Red "Merry Christmas, Happy Holidays" (Capital/2101) — Producer
 Midnight Red "Say Yes" (Capital/2101) — Writer/Producer
 SHINee "321" (EMI Records Japan) — Writer/Producer

2014 
 Penavega "Electrico" (Single) — Writer/Producer
 Cara Quici "Fight" (QMH Records) — Writer/Producer
 Cascada "Blink" (Zooland Records) — Writer
 Cory Lee "Boomerang" (Costa Music Inc.) — Writer/Producer
 The Next Star Supergroup: Rebel Coast "Don't Stop Now" (The Next Star) — Writer/Producer
 The Next Star Supergroup: Electric Ave "Big Bang" (The Next Star) — Writer/Producer
 Bonnie Anderson "Blackout" (Sony Australia) — Writer/Producer
 Kim Sozzi "Never Say Goodnight" (Nervous Records) — Writer/Producer
 Abraham Mateo "It's U", Who I AM, (Sony Music Spain) — Writer
 Abraham Mateo "Fue Un Error Amarte", Who I AM, (Sony Music Spain) — Writer
 After Romeo "Juliet" single (Sony Music Japan) — Writer/Producer

2016
 Banners "Start A Riot (Thundatraxx Remix)" (Island/Universal) -Producer/Remixer
 Tiffany  "Yellow Light" I Just Wanna Dance (SM Entertainment) - Writer/Producer
 Abraham Mateo "I'm Feelin' So Good" Are You Ready?, (Sony Music Spain) — Writer
 Jordan White "High Road" (Pangea Records) - Writer/Producer
 OoVee ft. Damon Sharpe "Free Spirits" (Universal Italy) - Writer
 Yanni "Rapture" — Writer

2017
 Bishop Briggs "Wild Horses (Thundatraxx and SKX Remix)" (Island/Universal) -Producer/Remixer
 New Kids On The Block "Hard Not Lovin' U" Thankful, (NKOTB Music LLC) -Songwriter/Producer
 Jordyn Jones "Summer" (Reload Music Group) -Producer/Songwriter
 SF9 "Wen Gamseongpariya (웬 감성팔이야; Why Are You So Sensetive)" Knights of the Sun, (FNC/LOEN) -Songwriter/Producer

2018
 Shinee "3 2 1"  Shinee The Best From Now On (EMI Records Japan) -Producer/Writer
 Jordyn Jones "Can't Say No" (Reload Music Group) -Producer/Songwriter
 Kendra Erika "Self Control"  (Dauman Music) -Producer
 Aveeno "Maxglow Commercial" -Producer
 Hilary Roberts "There For You"  (Dauman Music) -Writer/Producer

2019
 Twice "Happy Happy"  (JYP Entertainment) -Writer
 Jordyn Jones "Cover up" (Reload Music Group) -Producer/Songwriter
 Hilary Roberts "Back To Life"  (Dauman Music) -Writer/Producer

2020
 Dave Winnel and Damon Sharpe, with Shannon "Under Your Control" (Armada Music) -Songwriter
 La Lana  "So Messed Up"   (Warner Music) -Producer/Songwriter
 Parisalexa ft. Dawty Music "Troubled Waters" (Single) — Writer/Producer
 Nexplanon "Vanessa Hudgens Commercial" -Producer/ writer
 Thundatraxx "Every Breath You Take".(Soave Records) – Artist/ Producer

Sources 

 , career credits recorded by ASCAP (not a complete listing of career credits)

1981 births
Living people
Singer-songwriters from New York (state)
People from Rockville Centre, New York
Record producers from New York (state)
American male singer-songwriters
21st-century American singers
21st-century American male singers